is a Japanese futsal club, currently playing in the F. League Division 2, the league second tier. The team is located in Hamamatsu city, Shizuoka Prefecture, Japan. Their home ground is Hamamatsu Arena.

Chronicle

Trophies

Regional
Tokai Regional League: 1
2006

References

External links
  

Futsal clubs in Japan
Futsal clubs established in 1996
1996 establishments in Japan